A Perfect Candidate is a 1996 documentary about the 1994 U.S. Senate race in Virginia between Democrat Chuck Robb and Republican Oliver North. The film aired on television as part of the PBS series P.O.V. in 1997, earning the network an Emmy Award nomination.

Release

Box office
Screened at only a few locations, the film grossed $134,485 at the box office.

Critical reception
The film received mostly positive reviews from critics. Rotten Tomatoes gives it a "fresh" rating of 88% , based on 17 reviews and an average score of 7/10. Roger Ebert gave the film three out of four stars. On At the Movies, Ebert and Gene Siskel each gave a thumbs up to the film. Hal Hinson of The Washington Post called it "the best American documentary since Hoop Dreams and one of a small handful of essential films about politics in this country."

Accolades

Home media
The film was first released on VHS by First Run Features on February 15, 2000. It was reissued on DVD by First Run on April 20, 2004 with special features, including an audio commentary by Cutler and Van Taylor.

References

External links

1996 films
1996 directorial debut films
1996 documentary films
1994 in Virginia
American documentary films
Documentary films about elections in the United States
Documentary films about Virginia
Films directed by R. J. Cutler
Films set in Virginia
Films shot in Virginia
Politics of Virginia
1990s English-language films
1990s American films